Bradley Gregg (born November 8, 1966) is an American actor.

Life and career 
Gregg has appeared in Hollywood films since the 1980s and is perhaps best known for his supporting roles in Stand by Me (1986), A Nightmare on Elm Street 3: Dream Warriors (1987) and Indiana Jones and the Last Crusade (1989).

Personal life 
He has been married to his wife, the former actress and current screenwriter Dawn Gregg, since 1987. They have 5 children: Braverijah, Mcabe, Galilee, Jemima, and Zion..

Filmography

Explorers (1985) - Steve Jackson's Gang Member
Stand by Me (1986) - Richard "Eyeball" Chambers
A Nightmare on Elm Street 3: Dream Warriors (1987) - Phillip Anderson
21 Jump Street (1988) - punk band member. 
Indiana Jones and the Last Crusade (1989) - Roscoe
Lonesome Dove (1989) - Sean O'Brien
Madhouse (1990) - Jonathan
Class of 1999 (1990) - Cody Culp
The Fisher King (1991) - Hippie Bum
Eye of the Storm (1991) - Steven
O Pioneers! (1992) (TV) - Young Oscar
Fire in the Sky (1993) - Bobby Cogdill
The Foot Shooting Party (1994) - Uncle Rose
George B. (1997) - Jerry
Nightwatch (1997) - Theater Actor (uncredited)
Vicious Circle (1997) - Carlos
How to Become Famous (1999) - Matt
Whiplash (2002) - Brad
Remnant (2012)
Toy Soldier (2015) - Darryl Curtis (voice)
Boonville Redemption (2016) - Pastor Virgil Palmer
Welcome to Acapulco (2019) - Anthony

as Producer:
14 Days in America (2005)

as Director:
Journey to Jemima (2006)
Cedars of Lebanon (2015)

References

External links

Official website

American male film actors
American male television actors
Living people
Male actors from California
Film directors from California
1966 births